Cistus chinamadensis is a shrubby species of flowering plant in the family Cistaceae, with purple-pink flowers, first described in 1991. It is endemic to the Canary Islands, where three subspecies occur on three separate islands (Tenerife, La Gomera and El Hierro). The species has been assessed as endangered in the IUCN Red List, being known only from small separated areas and facing a variety of threats.

Description
The woody stems have dark brown bark that easily frays and strips off. The upper branches have a dense velvety covering of fine hairs (indumentum), beige to off-white in colour. The leaves have three prominent veins. The upper sides of the leaves are more-or-less smooth, the lower sides rough and reticulate, to a varying degree between the subspecies.

The flowers are arranged in open, slightly branched cymes, with 4–8 flowers to each inflorescence. The yellow stamens are somewhat shorter than the sepals. In its native habitat, C. chinamadenis flowers in May and produces seeds in June to July.

Taxonomy and phylogeny
Cistus chinamadensis was first described in 1991 by Ángel Bañares Baudet and Pedro Romero Manrique. The species was first found at Roque de los Pinos near to the village of Chinamada in the Anaga region of Tenerife; hence the specific epithet chinamadensis meaning "from Chinamada". Two subspecies were initially described, C. chinamadensis subsp. chinamadensis and C. ch. subsp. gomerae. In 2005 a further subspecies, C. ch. subsp. ombriosus, was described by Jean-Pierre Demoly and M. Marrero.

A 2011 molecular phylogenetic study placed C. chinamadensis as a member of the purple and pink flowered clade of Cistus species, along with some other Canary Island endemics (Cistus asper, Cistus horrens, Cistus ocreatus, and Cistus symphytifolius), although the three subspecies did not form a clade, with some analyses separating C. ch. subsp. ombriosus in particular from the other two subspecies.

Distribution and habitat
Cistus chinamadensis is endemic to the Canary Islands.

Conservation
In 2011 when its status was assessed as "endangered" according to the IUCN Red List criteria, Cistus chinamadensis was known from seven locations in the Canary Islands. C. ch. ssp. chinamadensis from Tenerife was present in three locations; its population appeared to be stable or increasing. C. ch. ssp. gomerae from La Gomera was found in two natural locations and has since been introduced to four others. Its range appeared to be decreasing. Threats to the species include a variety of natural hazards, such as landslides, fires and drought, and biological hazards, such as grazing.

References

External links
 

chinamadensis
Plants described in 1991
Flora of the Canary Islands